The Men's 100 metre breaststroke SB7 swimming event at the 2004 Summer Paralympics was competed on 21 September. It was won by Sascha Kindred, representing , with two swimmers tied in bronze medal position.

1st round

Heat 1
21 Sept. 2004, morning session

Heat 2
21 Sept. 2004, morning session

Final round

21 Sept. 2004, evening session

References

M